Switchstance is the first and only EP by Quarashi, the first record released by the group. It became a hit in Iceland due to the title track. Only 500 copies were made of Switchstance, which all sold within a week. Copies of the EP are now rare, and it is considered a collector's item.

Track listing
"Switchstance" – 3:41
"Beam Me Up" (featuring Magga Stina) – 4:21
"¿Qué?" [Instrumental] – 1:10
"Lone Rangers" (featuring Magga Stina) – 4:20
"Speedo" [Instrumental] – 7:30

External links
 Quarashi's blog, which hosts a free, high-quality download of the EP

Quarashi albums